Espionage Made Easy is the second full-length studio album from Californian hardcore/metalcore band, Cold War. It was released in May 2007 on the notable independent hardcore specialist label, Indecision Records.

Track listing 
 All songs written by Cold War
"Bloodrush" – 2:22
"My Saviour" – 4:06
"The Mountain" – 4:10
"Gotta Be" – 2:28
"Fire It Up" – 3:25
"Intermission" – 0:18
"What Great Purpose" – 3:31
"Outside of the Incrowd" – 2:51
"Still Kickin" – 2:49
"The Traveler" – 4:49
"To the MaXXX" – 2:47

Credits 
 Steve Helferich – vocals
 Geoff Harman – guitar
 Justin Jolley – guitar
 Chris Thomson – bass
 Marc Jackson – drums
 Additional vocals by Dave Peters (Throwdown) and Dave Richards
 Additional guitars and bass by Justin Sturm
 Recorded and mixed at Victoria Street Studios, Costa Mesa, California, US

References

External links 
 Indecision Records website

2007 albums
Cold War (band) albums
Indecision Records albums